Prodoxus carnerosanellus is a moth of the family Prodoxidae. It is found in the Big Bend region of western Texas, United States. It is probably also present in Mexico.

The wingspan is 8.1-10.9 mm for males and 8.9-12.8 mm for females. The forewings are white with a chocolate brown area. The hindwings are white with light gray shading. Adults are on wing in April.

The larvae feed on Yucca carnerosana. They feed in a hardening gallery inside the fruit wall of developing fruit of their host. Larval cohorts of the species emerge as adults over several years even when artificial winter and water is provided.

Etymology
The species name is derived from its only known host, Yucca carnerosana.

References

Moths described in 2005
Prodoxidae